Inishmurray ( or ) is an uninhabited island situated  off the coast of County Sligo, Ireland.

Geography 

Etymology 
Inishmurray may be named after the early saint, Muiredach mac Echdach (fl. early 6th century) of Killala.

History 
There are remains of an early Irish monastic settlement. Laisrén (Saint Molaise) Mac Decláin reputedly founded a monastery here in the 6th century. He was confessor of Saint Columba (Colmcille) after the Battle of Cúl Dreimhne on the mainland nearby. His feast day is 12 August.

The island's ecclesiastical settlement was attacked in 795 and again in 807 by the Vikings, and eventually the monks abandoned the island and it remained uninhabited until the first secular settlement, probably in the 12th century.

Monastery
The site contains various ecclesiastical buildings including enclosures, a stone-roofed oratory, two churches, a clochán, a large beehive-shaped cell, a holy well and other remains including cross slabs suggesting foreign influences. The whole complex is composed of what is probably local sandstone rubble.

Recent history
The local population peaked at just over 100 in the 1880s but the last residents moved out to the mainland on 12 November 1948. Some of the buildings are still visible including 15 houses and the island's school. The site remained a pilgrimage destination right up to recent times. In 2018, the Marine Survey Office of the Department of Transport, Tourism and Sport caused controversy when it banned commercial operators from landing visitors on the island, due "to concerns for safety during embarking and disembarking".

See also
 List of abbeys and priories in Ireland (County Sligo)

Literature 
 Jerry O'Sullivan and Tomas O Carragain: "Inishmurray: Monks and Pilgrims in an Atlantic Landscape", Collins, Cork, 2008,  (v. 1) 
 Joe McGowan: Inishmurray: Island Voices, Aeolus Publications, 2004, .
 John Haywood: The Historical Atlas of the Celtic World, Thames & Hudson, 2009, .
 H.Th. De Booy: Het spook van Inish Murray (Ghost at Inishmurray - fiction). Deltos Elsevier, Amsterdam/Brussel 1971, .

References

External links 

 Inishmurray website

Christian monasteries in the Republic of Ireland
Important Bird Areas of the Republic of Ireland
Islands of County Sligo
National Monuments in County Sligo
Uninhabited islands of Ireland